Casey Dienel (born March 10, 1985) is an American singer-songwriter and musician.  She released her debut album, Wind-Up Canary, in 2006 on Hush Records. Dienel has also performed and recorded as White Hinterland, whose first album, titled Phylactery Factory, was released on March 4, 2008, by the independent record label Dead Oceans. Dienel plays piano, keyboards and ukulele.

Early life and education

Casey Dienel spent the bulk of her youth in Scituate, Massachusetts.  She took her first piano lessons at age 4, and at age 14 began writing her own pop songs. While attending Scituate High School, Dienel formed a short-lived band named The Bong Loads.

After high school, Dienel moved to Boston to attend the New England Conservatory of Music, having turned down an offer of acceptance from Sarah Lawrence College.  After one semester of studying classical vocals, she opted to switch her major to classical composition. Dienel studied with many notable musicians at the conservatory, including jazz vocalist Dominique Eade and composer Lee Hyla. While living in Boston during her conservatory years, Dienel met Dylan Metrano of the band Tiger Saw, and was an occasional member of the band's rotating lineup.

After two years at the conservatory, Dienel took an indefinite leave of absence to pursue her own music career.

Early solo work

Wind-Up Canary

During the winter of 2005, Dienel was offered the chance to record for free at an abandoned caretaker's house on a farm in Leominster, Massachusetts. With some conservatory friends and a piano borrowed from the lobby of a local hotel, she recorded a number of her own songs without any intention of releasing them. Without Dienel's knowledge, a copy of these recordings made its way to Chad Crouch, the head of Hush Records, who contacted her about releasing an album. Dienel agreed and Hush released the recordings as Wind-Up Canary in March 2006 to widely favorable reviews.

Vessels

On November 29, 2006, Casey Dienel announced that she was working with producer Djim Reynolds on recording an EP titled Vessels, and that she hoped to release it in early 2007. Dienel had this to say about the project:

To date, Vessels remains unreleased—however, there are live recordings and lyrics for the song available on the Internet.

White Hinterland

Phylactery Factory

On January 4, 2008, after a few months hinting at "change," Dienel announced in her blog that "for the present and foreseeable future, there won’t be any more Casey Dienel." Her blog post coincided with Dead Oceans' announcement of the forthcoming release of White Hinterland's album Phylactery Factory:

Luniculaire
In 2009, White Hinterland released an EP called Luniculaire.

Kairos
On March 9, 2010, White Hinterland released its second full-length album, Kairos, via Dead Oceans. Pitchfork rated the album 7.5 on its 10-point scale, with reviewer Patrick Sisson writing that Dienel "swoons on 'Cataract' and 'Magnolias', two of the gorgeous tracks in which her sweet tone and confident phrasing, along with unfurled guitar melodies, recall Bitte Orca," the acclaimed 2009 album from the Dirty Projectors. Reviewing "Icarus", the first single off of Kairos, Brandon Stusoy noted the songs "hushed experimental threads" and said compared to previous work, Icarus "pushes things deeper and then recasts it in a denser electro realm."

White Hinterland released videos for Kairos songs "Amsterdam," "Begin Again," and "No Logic".

In 2010, White Hinterland toured the US and Europe with the album.  A song from this album, "Icarus", was selected by Revlon to be used in their 2010 commercial for Just Bitten Lip Stain, starring Jessica Biel and directed by Kathryn Bigelow. Later the same year, "Icarus" was featured in an episode of the ABC Family drama "Pretty Little Liars," as well the fashion show of the winner of the Project Runway (season 8) finale, Gretchen Jones. The song was also used in the 2010 film It's Kind of a Funny Story.

Baby

White Hinterland released its third studio album Baby on April 1, 2014, through Dead Oceans. Dienel made the ten-song album in a home studio she developed in the basement of her childhood home in Scituate.

Controversy

In May 2016, it was reported that Justin Bieber and Skrillex were being sued for copyright infringement by White Hinterland, who claims the duo used Dienel's vocal loop from her 2014 song "Ring the Bell" without permission in the song "Sorry". Eight seconds of the "Ring the Bell" riff is allegedly used six times in "Sorry." Co-writers are also included in the suit. Producer Skrillex responded to the claim by uploading a video of himself manipulating the vocals of co-writer Julia Michaels. The lawsuit was later dropped.

Further solo work

Imitation of a Woman To Love
On May 18, 2017, Dienel released another album under her own name, entitled Imitation of a Woman To Love; Dienel served as the album's writer, singer, producer and engineer. She released two singles from the album: "High Times" (released April 12, 2017; Dienel played every  and "Thrasher" (April 28, 2017). Writing for Rolling Stone, Maura Johnston called the album a "sprawling, stunning collection".

Personal life
From 2008 Dienel lived in Portland, Oregon until she moved back to Scituate to make Baby. She now lives in Brooklyn.

Discography

As Casey Dienel
 Wind Up Canary (2006, Hush Records)
 Imitation of a Woman to Love (2017, Paddle Your Own Canoe Society)

As White Hinterland
Phylactery Factory (2008, Dead Oceans)
Luniculaire EP (2008, Dead Oceans)
Kairos (2010, Dead Oceans)
Baby (2014, Dead Oceans)

References

External links
 Musings: Casey Dienel's blog

1985 births
Living people
American women singer-songwriters
Musicians from Boston
21st-century American singers
21st-century American women singers
Dead Oceans artists
Singer-songwriters from Massachusetts